Pierre Koralnik (born 22 December 1938) is a French film director and screenwriter. He directed the 1967 film Anna, which starred Anna Karina.

Selected filmography
 Anna (1967)
 Cannabis (1970)

References

External links

1938 births
Living people
French film directors
French male screenwriters
French screenwriters
Writers from Paris